Abraham "Bram" Peper (13 February 1940 – 20 August 2022) was a Dutch politician of the Labour Party (PvdA).

Early life
After finishing the Hogere Burgerschool, Peper studied social sciences at the University of Amsterdam until 1965, and economy and sociology at the University of Oslo (1963–1964) and got his PhD at the Nederlandse Economische Hogeschool (Currently Erasmus University Rotterdam) in 1972.

Career
Peper became a researcher, and fulfilled several academic functions, including professor at the Erasmus University until he became Mayor of Rotterdam in 1982 at the age of 42. Rotterdam is the second largest city of the Netherlands, and Peper was one of the youngest mayors of a large city at the time.

In 1984, an interview with Peper and his wife with Ischa Meijer was published in Vrij Nederland, a Dutch magazine, in which Peper was critical of citizens and rulers. The interview was perceived as arrogant, and seemed to be made while Peper was in a drunk condition. Peper made his apologies, and soon after he and his wife divorced.

While Peper was mayor, the city completed its process of rebuilding after World War II, which resulted in a new skyline for Rotterdam. In the second half of his mayorship, Peper had a tough time with for instance his defeat on the formation of a city province (90% of the voters in a referendum were against). Peper was mayor until 1998, when he joined the government as Minister of the Interior of the Netherlands in the second Kok cabinet.

Starting in 1999, rumours were spreading that Peper had made incorrect declarations while he was mayor of Rotterdam. On 13 March 2000 Peper resigned as minister, according to himself to no longer bring problems to the public government, and to be better able to defend himself. Although a report on 17 March suggested that Peper did not act properly regarding the declarations, Peper won the legal procedures finally two years later.

Later life and death
From 2002 to 2004, Peper was professor at the Nyenrode Business University, a private university, from which he resigned due to a disagreement regarding a study trip to the European Union in Brussels.

Peper died on 20 August 2022, at the age of 82.

Decorations

Notes

References

External links
 
 Dr. A. (Bram) Peper Parlement & Politiek 

1940 births
2022 deaths
Dutch sociologists
Dutch nonprofit directors
Dutch expatriates in Norway
Erasmus University Rotterdam alumni
Academic staff of Erasmus University Rotterdam
Labour Party (Netherlands) politicians
Mayors of Rotterdam
Ministers of the Interior of the Netherlands
Ministers of Kingdom Relations of the Netherlands
Academic staff of Nyenrode Business University
Officers of the Order of Orange-Nassau
Politicians from Haarlem
University of Amsterdam alumni
20th-century Dutch educators
20th-century Dutch politicians
21st-century Dutch politicians